Beverly Rae Kimes (August 17, 1939 – May 12, 2008) was an American automotive journalist and historian, known as the "First Lady of Automotive History" and "The Grande Dame of Automobile History". She was born in West Chicago, Illinois on August 17, 1939 and grew up in Wheaton, Illinois. She received a bachelor's degree from the University of Illinois, and a master's degree in journalism from the Pennsylvania State University.

Her first job was at Automobile Quarterly in 1963. She claimed that the total extent of her car knowledge when she started was the info on her driver's license. She had originally wanted to be a theater writer, but once she started writing about cars, the theater dream faded. She said, "My first assignment was a history of the Curved Dash Oldsmobile and I was hooked." She was promoted to head editor in 1975, a position she held until 1981, when she left to concentrate on free-lance writing.

Books 
She went on to write 15 books, including "The Standard Catalog of American Automobiles", considered by auto journalists as the most comprehensive work on the history of defunct automobile companies. Her co-writer was Henry Austin Clark, Jr. Some of her other works include "The Classic Era," "Pioneers, Engineers, And Scoundrels: The Dawn Of The Automobile In America," "The Star and the Laurel: The Centennial History of Daimler, Mercedes, and Benz, 1886-1986," “Packard: A History of the Motor Car and the Company,” "The Cars That Henry Ford Built," "Walter L Marr: Buick's Amazing Engineer," (with James H. Cox), (books which won the Nicholas-Joseph Cugnot Award), "Chevrolet: A History from 1911," (with Robert Ackerson), "Speed, Style and Beauty, and "My Two Lives" She also became editor of the Classic Car magazine, for the Classic Car Club of America.

Awards 
Kimes received numerous awards including several Moto Awards from the International Automotive Media Awards and the Thomas McKean Memorial Cup from the Antique Automobile Club of America. She was honored by Society of Automobile Historians as a Friend of Automotive History, their highest award. In 1993, she received a Distinguished Service Citation from the Automotive Hall of Fame.
She also was given a Lifetime Achievement Award as well as the Best of Books honor from IAM Awards.

Besides books, she wrote hundreds of articles, many of them winning the Karl Benz Award. In 2005, she was awarded a Lifetime Achievement Award from the International Automotive Media Awards. Probably no auto historian has been cited as many times as Beverly Rae Kimes.

Personal life and death 
In 1984, Kimes was married to James H. Cox, her collaborator on the Walter Marrs book. Her full name after marriage was Beverly Rae Kimes Cox.

She loved New York City and was active in city improvement activities, including being the President of The East 80th St Block Association, and an officer for the U of I Alumni Club of Greater New York.

Kimes' husband, James Cox, announced her death on May 12, 2008. She died of kidney failure in Lenox Hill Hospital in Manhattan, New York.

References

1939 births
2008 deaths
People from Wheaton, Illinois
People from West Chicago, Illinois
Journalists from Illinois
Historians from Illinois
American women historians
20th-century American journalists
20th-century American historians
20th-century American women writers
21st-century American journalists
21st-century American historians
21st-century American women writers
University of Illinois alumni
Pennsylvania State University alumni
Automotive historians